Corey Glasgow (born 20 March 1979) is a Barbadian cricketer. He played in two first-class matches for the Barbados cricket team in 1999/00 and 2000/01.

See also
 List of Barbadian representative cricketers

References

External links
 

1979 births
Living people
Barbadian cricketers
Barbados cricketers